Girls Like Robots is a game developed by American studio Popcannibal for multiple platforms and published initially on iOS by Adult Swim on October 11, 2012. It is a puzzle game about seating arrangements.

Critical reception
The iOS version has a Metacritic score of 88% based on 10 critic reviews.

References

2012 video games
Adult Swim games
IOS games
Linux games
MacOS games
Popcannibal games
Puzzle video games
Video games about robots
Video games developed in the United States
Wii U eShop games
Windows games